Maire (also Meere or Mare) is a former village in the Dutch province of Zeeland. It was located northwest of the village of Rilland.

The church of Maire was mentioned in 1284. The village suffered from a number of floods, and on 5 November 1530, it drowned completely. When it was flooded again on 2 November 1532, it was abandoned completely. A small part of the area was reclaimed from the sea in 1694, but the village was never rebuilt.

Maire was a separate municipality until 1816, when it was merged with Rilland.

See also
List of flooded villages in Zeeland

References

Former municipalities of Zeeland
Former populated places in the Netherlands
Reimerswaal (municipality)